Loxocarya is a plant genus in the family Restionaceae, described as a genus in 1810.

The entire genus is endemic to the State of Western Australia.

 Species

References

Restionaceae
Poales genera
Endemic flora of Australia